Kiisa may refer to several places in Estonia:

Kiisa, small borough in Saku Parish, Harju County
Kiisa, Pärnu County, village in Tori Parish, Pärnu County
Kiisa, Põlva County, village in Põlva Parish, Põlva County
Kiisa, Viljandi County, village in Viljandi Parish, Viljandi County